HVP may refer to:

 Haryana Vikas Party, a former political party in Haryana, India
 Herpesvirus papio, a gammaherpesviruse found in baboons
 High value products, defined by the United States Department of Agriculture
 Hindu Vidya Peeth, a secondary school in  Sonepat, Haryana, India
 Horizontal and Vertical Position (ANSI), an ANSI X3.64 escape sequence
 Hudson Valley Philharmonic, in Poughkeepsie, New York, United States
 Human Variome Project
 Hydrolyzed vegetable protein, a food ingredient
 Hypervelocity projectile, a munition
Hansen vs. Predator, a predator investigation show hosted by Chris Hansen